Poland competed at the 1964 Summer Olympics in Tokyo, Japan. 140 competitors, 115 men and 25 women, took part in 87 events in 12 sports.

Medalists

Gold
 Józef Szmidt —  Athletics, Men's Triple jump
 Teresa Ciepły, Irena Kirszenstein, Halina Górecka, Ewa Kłobukowska —  Athletics, Women's 4×100 metres relay
 Jozef Grudzien, — Boxing, Men's Lightweight
 Jerzy Kulej — Boxing, Men's Light welterweight
 Marian Kasprzyk — Boxing, Men's Welterweight
 Egon Franke — Fencing, Men's Foil Individual
 Waldemar Baszanowski — Weightlifting, Men's Lightweight (67.5 kg)

Silver
 Andrzej Zieliński, Wiesław Maniak, Marian Foik, Marian Dudziak —  Athletics, Men's 4×100 metres relay
 Teresa Ciepły —  Athletics, Women's 80 metres hurdles
 Irena Kirszenstein —  Athletics, Women's 200 metres 
 Irena Kirszenstein —  Athletics, Women's Long jump
 Artur Olech — Boxing, Men's Flyweight
 Witold Woyda, Zbigniew Skrudlik, Ryszard Parulski, Egon Franke, Janusz Rozycki — Fencing, Men's Foil Team

Bronze
 Andrzej Badeński —  Athletics, Men's 400 metres 
 Ewa Kłobukowska —  Athletics, Women's 100 metres 
 Józef Grzesiak —  Boxing, Men's Light middleweight
 Tadeusz Walasek — Boxing, Men's Middleweight
 Zbigniew Pietrzykowski — Boxing, Men's Light heavyweight
 Emil Ochyra, Jerzy Pawłowski, Ryszard Zub, Andrzej Piatkowski, Wojciech Zabłocki — Fencing, Men's Sabre Team
 Krystyna Czajkowska, Josefa Ledwignowa, Maria Golimowska, Jadwiga Rutkowska, Danuta Kordaczuk, Krystyna Jakubowska, Jadwiga Marko, Maria Sliwkowa, Zofia Szczesniewska, Krystina Krupowa, Hanna Krystyna Busz and Barbara Hermela-Niemczyk —  Volleyball, Women's Team Competition
 Mieczysław Nowak — Weightlifting, Men's Featherweight (60 kg)
 Marian Zieliński — Weightlifting, Men's Lightweight (67.5 kg)
 Ireneusz Paliński — Weightlifting, Men's Middle heavyweight (90 kg)

Athletics

Men
Track & road events

Field events

Women
Track & road events

Field events

Basketball

Preliminary round

Group A

11 October

12 October

13 October

14 October

16 October

17 October

18 October

Classification brackets
5th–8th Place

20 October

5th Place

22 October

Boxing

Men

Canoeing

Sprint
Men

Women

Cycling

Eight cyclists represented Poland in 1964.

Road

Track
1000m time trial

Men's Sprint

Pursuit

Fencing

15 fencers, all men, represented Poland in 1964.

Men

Gymnastics

Artistic
Men

Women

Rowing

Men

Shooting

Six shooters represented Poland in 1964.

Men

Volleyball

Women's team competition

Round robin

|}

Final standings

Team roster

 Krystyna Czajkowska
 Maria Golimowska
 Krystyna Jakubowska
 Danuta Kordaczuk

 Krystyna Krupowa
 Josefa Ledwignowa
 Jadwiga Marko
 Jadwiga Rutkowska

 Maria Sliwkowa
 Zofia Szczesniewska
 Hanna Krystyna Busz
 Barbara Hermela

Head coach

Weightlifting

Men

Wrestling

Men's Greco-Roman

References

External links
Official Olympic Reports
International Olympic Committee results database

Nations at the 1964 Summer Olympics
1964
1964 in Polish sport